Warren Munson (born November 30, 1933) is an American film and television actor.

Career 
Munson's likeness and voice were used to portray Admiral Owen Paris in two early episodes of Star Trek: Voyager.  He also played the role of Vice Admiral Marcus Holt in the Star Trek: The Next Generation seventh season episode "Interface".

On television, Munson played the recurring character of Dr. Richard London in the soap opera Port Charles. He also had guest roles as a doctor in seven other productions including the recurring role of Dr. Thompson in Father Murphy.

On film, Munson most recently appeared in the 2003 movie Down with Love (with Jeri Ryan, Michael Ensign, Jude Ciccolella, and Diana R. Lupo). Other recent films in which he has appeared are Beautiful (with Michael McKean, Jessica Collins, Jordan Lund, Spice Williams, and Nikita Ager), Intrepid (with Robert Bauer, Kevin Rahm, and Clive Revill), and California Myth (with Bibi Besch and Don Stark). In the 1989 movie Friday the 13th Part VIII: Jason Takes Manhattan, Munson played another admiral opposite Peter Mark Richman.

Munson also appeared in the television movie Childhood Sweetheart? (with Michael Reilly Burke, Ed Lauter, Leon Russom, Barbara Babcock, Ronny Cox, Stephanie Erb, Derek Webster, and Buck McDancer).

Filmography

Film

Television

References 

1933 births
Living people
Actors from Schenectady, New York
American male film actors
American male television actors
American male voice actors
20th-century American male actors
Male actors from New York (state)